The remaining RAF units vacated Deversoir following the coup that saw Gamal Abdel Nasser seize power in June 1956.

Deversoir Air Base (LG-209) is an active airbase of the Egyptian Air Force, known as 'Abu Sultan', located approximately 19 km south-southeast of Ismailia (Al Isma`iliyah); 116 km northeast of Cairo.  It was formerly a major Royal Air Force airfield known as RAF Deversoir  built before World War II. A helicopter unit with SA-342 Gazelle helicopters is based here.

History
Deversoir was a Royal Air Force (RAF) military airfield built in the 1930s.   It was built part of the defences of the Suez Canal,  being constructed at the northwest shore of the Great Bitter Lake.   During World War II, it was used as a military airfield by the RAF and the United States Army Air Force during the North African Campaign against Axis forces.

The airfield received United States President Franklin D. Roosevelt on 12 February 1945 as he flew from the Yalta Conference to rejoin the USS Quincy, which was anchored in the Great Bitter Lake and would host the President's meetings with King Farouk of Egypt, King Abdulaziz of Saudi Arabia, and Emperor Haile Selassie of Ethiopia before transporting him back to the United States.

Deversoir appears to have been used by the RAF after the war until March 1955 when it was handed over to the Egyptian Air Force. Modern hardened aircraft shelters were built on wartime-era dispersal pads, and recent runway markings are evident in aerial photography. The airbase is being used to accommodate a helicopter unit flying SA 342 Gazelle, armed helicopters.

RAF Deversoir was operative as 324 Fighter Wing in 1950 when it was the home of three squadrons of De Havilland Vampire aircraft plus three Gloster Meteors, one to each squadron. The squadrons were numbers 213 and 249. Some time near the end of WW2 the station had been used to house Italian prisoners of war and this was evidenced by a painting done by one of them which was present in 1950 - 1952 in one of the cookhouse dining room for other ranks.

During the mid 1950s Canal Zone patrols were carried out by RAF jets from the station. A rotation of standby aircraft from the station's Vampire squadrons was put in place, with RAF jets frequently scrambled to intercept Egyptian air force aircraft. This included Meteors and Constellations. 

Relations between the United Kingdom and Egypt continued to deteriorate in the wake of the 1952 revolution. 

213 (Fighter) Squadron, the last RAF flying squadron based there, disbanded at Deversoir on 30th September, 1954, with the pilots and ground crew dispersed to other RAF stations outside Egypt.

Major units assigned
 Royal Air Force
 No 33 Air Stores Park (4 - 17 Jul 1942, 2 Sep - 15 Oct 1943)
 No 63 Repair & Salvage Unit (7 Jul - Aug 1943)
 No 26 Anti-Aircraft Co-operation Unit (6 Mar 1945 - 1 Jan 1946)
 HQ, No 324 Wing (28 Aug 1948 - Feb 1951)
 Known squadrons (dates assigned undetermined)
 6, 8, 32, 73, 213, 249, 256 417, 680

 United States Army Air Forces (Ninth Air Force)
 57th Bombardment Wing 5 June-28 August 1943
 12th Bombardment Group, 31 July–October 1942, B-25 Mitchell
 316th Troop Carrier Group, 23 November–December 1942. C-47 Skytrain
 19th Photographic Mapping Squadron, January 30, 1944-31 Jan 1945 (B-24/F-7 Liberator)

See also
 List of World War II North Africa Airfields

References

 Maurer, Maurer. Air Force Combat Units of World War II. Maxwell AFB, Alabama: Office of Air Force History, 1983. .
 
 Royal Air Force Airfield Creation for the Western Desert Campaign

External links

Airfields of the United States Army Air Forces in Egypt
Egyptian Air Force bases
World War II airfields in Egypt